Padmini Kolhapure is an Indian actress and singer, who works primarily in Hindi films. She began her acting career in 1972 at the age of seven, and her early works include Zindagi (1976) and Dream Girl (1977). She had her breakthrough with the film Satyam Shivam Sundaram (1978), starring as the young Roopa. She is the recipient of two Filmfare Awards.

At the age of 15, Kolhapure won the Filmfare Award for Best Supporting Actress for her performance in the revenge drama Insaf Ka Tarazu (1980), and at the age of 17, won the Filmfare Award for Best Actress for the musical romantic drama Prem Rog (1982), thus becoming the second-youngest actress to win the awards in the respective categories. She was also nominated for the Best Supporting Actress for her role in Souten (1983) and also received another Best Actress nomination for Pyar Jhukta Nahin (1985).

Early life 
Padmini Kolhapure was born in a Marathi family, second among the three daughters of Pandharinath Kolhapure, a professional musician, by his wife Nirupama Kolhapure. Her elder sister is the former actress Shivangi Kolhapure, wife of actor Shakti Kapoor and mother of actress Shraddha Kapoor and actor Siddhanth Kapoor. Her younger sister, Tejaswini Kolhapure, too is an actress.

The family took the surname "Kolhapure" because they hailed from Kolhapur in Maharashtra. Padmini's mother, Nirupama Kolhapure, was born into a Konkani-speaking Konkani Brahmin Marathi family belonging to Mangalore in Karnataka. Padmini's father, Pandharinath Kolhapure, was a talented vocalist and Veena player. He was the son of Pandit Krishnarao Kolhapure (partner in Balvant Natak Academy along with Pandit Deenanath Mangeshkar), an exponent of Natya Sangeet, who had enjoyed the patronage of the Baroda Durbar. Pandharinath's mother was the half-sister of Pandit Deenanath Mangeshkar, and sister of Balwantrao Abhisheki, the father of vocalist Jitendra Abhisheki. Thus, Padmini is niece of legendary singers Lata Mangeshkar and Asha Bhonsle.  Her mother formerly used to work as ground staff with Air India.

While working for the film Aisa Pyar Kahan, Padmini met Pradeep Sharma alias Tutu Sharma, who was the producer of the film. They were married after a brief courtship in 1986. They have a son named Priyaank Sharma, born in Feb 1990. Priyank had assisted filmmaker Rajkumar Santoshi for the film Phata Poster Nikla Hero and has worked as an actor. He married producer Karim Morani's daughter and Zoa Morani's sister Shaza on 4 February 2021.

Career 
As a child, she sang in the chorus for songs in films such as Yaadon Ki Baaraat, Kitab and Dushman Dost with her sister Shivangi. Padmini later sang for her own films such as Vidhaata, Daana Pani, Professor Ki Padosan Hum Intezaar Karenge and Sadak Chaap (with Kishore Kumar). She released an album with Bappi Lahiri titled Music Lovers. She performed for the Greater London Council at the Royal Albert Hall in London with Bappi Lahiri and his troupe in 1986. Asha Bhosle suggested Padmini's name to Dev Anand, who then cast her in Ishq Ishq Ishq (1975). This led to other films, such as Dreamgirl (1977), Zindagi (1976), and Saajan Bina Suhagan (1978). She also gave a very commendable performance of a school girl inflicted by black magic in Gehrayee (1980).

Her mother quit her airlines job to be a full-time chaperone as Padmini picked up more roles. Her most famous child role was playing a child in Raj Kapoor's 1977 film Satyam Shivam Sundaram. Her success led to her most controversial role in Insaaf Ka Tarazu (1980), a remake of Lipstick (1976), where she played the rape victim that was originally played by Mariel Hemingway. She earned the Filmfare Award for Best Supporting Actress for her performance. She graduated to heroine roles at the age of 15 in Nasir Hussain's Zamane Ko Dikhana Hai opposite Rishi Kapoor. The film flopped, but she reunited with Rishi for his father Raj Kapoor's blockbuster musical romantic drama Prem Rog (1982), which earned her a Filmfare Award for Best Actress. She also earned a Filmfare Special Performance Award for Ahista Ahista (1981).Padmini was known for her professionalism and diligence. She even worked when she had fever on Do Dilon Ki Dastaan (1985). She had more box office hits, such as Vidhaata (1982) and Souten (1983). She had a huge hit with Pyar Jhukta Nahin (1985) with Mithun Chakraborty, and they were paired together in several more films. She agreed to work with Anil Kapoor when he was a newcomer in his first film Woh Saat Din (1983). The movie was a hit and helped cement his name in the Indian film industry; Anil Kapoor attributes his eventual success in the film industry to her "luck".

After her son grew up, she returned to acting in 2004, such as for the Marathi films Manthan and Chimnee Pakhar, which was a huge hit and earned her a Screen Award in the Best Marathi Actress category. She appeared in the 2006 horror film Eight Shani. She appeared in Mera Bachpan with Helen in 2008. She has also acted on stage in Kaash, followed by Abhi To Mein Jawan Hoon and Aasman Se Gire Khajoor Pe Atke, with her brother-in-law Shakti Kapoor.

In 2011, she made her foray into Malayalam cinema with V. K. Prakash's Karmayogi, an adaptation of Shakespeare's Hamlet. In 2013, she played Shahid Kapoor's mother in the comedy film Phata Poster Nikla Hero (2013). She was considered to play the role of Tulsi Virani in Kyunki Saas Bhi Kabhi Bahu Thi after Smriti Irani left the project, but the role was ultimately played by Gautami Kapoor.

Selected filmography

Television

Awards and nominations

Other awards 

 2003 Kalakar Award – Achiever Award
 2006 Screen Best Actress Award for Chimnee Pakhre (Marathi)

References

External links 
 
 

Living people
Actresses in Hindi cinema
Indian child actresses
Indian women playback singers
Indian film actresses
Marathi people
Actresses from Mumbai
21st-century Indian actresses
20th-century Indian actresses
Singers from Mumbai
Women musicians from Maharashtra
Bollywood playback singers
20th-century Indian singers
20th-century Indian women singers
21st-century Indian singers
21st-century Indian women singers
Filmfare Awards winners
Actresses in Malayalam cinema
Actresses in Marathi cinema
1965 births